A Buyer's Market is the second novel in Anthony Powell's twelve-novel series, A Dance to the Music of Time.  Published in 1952, it continues the story of narrator Nick Jenkins with his introduction into society after boarding school and university.

The book presents new characters, notably the painter Mr. Deacon, female acquaintance Gypsy Jones and artist Ralph Barnby, as well as reappearances by Jenkins' school friends Peter Templer, Charles Stringham and Kenneth Widmerpool.  The action takes place in London high society in the late 1920s. At a dinner party there is discussion of the Earl Haig statue. At an after party given by Mrs.Andriadis Nick meets his former professor, Sillery and observes industrialist Magnus Donners. In the summer Nick visits the castle of industrialist Donners, who employs both Stringham and Widmerpool.

References

1952 British novels
Novels by Anthony Powell
A Dance to the Music of Time
Fiction set in 1928
Fiction set in 1929
Novels set in London
Heinemann (publisher) books